Ohmic heating (joule heating, resistance heating, or electroconductive heating) generates heat by passage of electrical current through food which resists the flow of electricity. Heat is generated rapidly and uniformly in the liquid matrix as well as in particulates, producing a higher quality sterile product that is suitable for aseptic processing.  

Electrical energy is linearly translated to thermal energy as electrical conductivity increases, and this is the key process parameter that affects heating uniformity and heating rate. This heating method is best for foods that contain particulates suspended in a weak salt containing medium due to their high resistance properties. Ohmic heating is beneficial due to its ability to inactivate microorganisms through thermal and non-thermal cellular damage. 

This method can also inactivate antinutritional factors thereby maintaining nutritional and sensory properties. However, ohmic heating is limited by viscosity, electrical conductivity, and fouling deposits. Although ohmic heating has not yet been approved by the Food and Drug Administration (FDA) for commercial use, this method has many potential applications, ranging from cooking to fermentation.

Process

There are different configurations for continuous ohmic heating systems, but the most basic process is outlined in Figure 1. A power supply or generator is needed to produce electrical current.  Electrodes, in direct contact with food, pass electric current through the matrix. The distance between the electrodes can be adjusted to achieve the optimum electrical field strength.

The generator creates the electrical current which flows to the first electrode and passes through the food product placed in the electrode gap. The food product resists the flow of current causing internal heating. The current continues to flow to the second electrode and back to the power source to close the circuit. The insulator caps around the electrodes controls the environment within the system.

The electrical field strength and the residence time are the key process parameters which affect heat generation.

Ideal food products 

The ideal foods for ohmic heating are viscous with particulates.

 Thick soups
 Sauces
 Stews
 Salsa
 Fruit in a syrup medium
 Milk
 Ice cream mix
 Egg
 Whey
 Heat sensitive liquids
 Soymilk

The efficiency by which electricity is converted to heat depends upon on salt, water, and fat content due to their thermal conductivity and resistance factors. In particulate foods, the particles heat up faster than the liquid matrix due to higher resistance to electricity and matching conductivity can contribute to uniform heating. This prevents overheating of the liquid matrix while particles receive sufficient heat processing. Table 1 shows the electrical conductivity values of certain foods to display the effect of composition and salt concentration. The high electrical conductivity values represent a larger number of ionic compounds suspended in the product, which is directly proportional to the rate of heating. This value is increased in the presence of polar compounds, like acids and salts, but decreased with nonpolar compounds, like fats. Electrical conductivity of food materials generally increases with temperature, and can change if there are structural changes caused during heating such as gelatinization of starch. Density, pH, and specific heat of various components in a food matrix can also influence heating rate.

Benefits 

Benefits of Ohmic heating include: uniform and rapid heating (>1°Cs−1), less cooking time, better energy efficiency, lower capital cost, and volumetric heating as compared to aseptic processing, [(Canning (food preservation method)|canning)], and [(Pulsed electric field processing|PEF)]. Volumetric heating allows internal heating instead of transferring heat from a secondary medium. This results in the production of safe, high quality food with minimal changes to structural, nutritional, and organoleptic properties of food. Heat transfer is uniform to reach areas of food that are harder to heat. Less fouling accumulates on the electrodes as compared to other heating methods. Ohmic heating also requires less cleaning and maintenance, resulting in an environmentally cautious heating method.

Effect on microorganisms

Microbial inactivation in ohmic heating is achieved by both thermal and non-thermal cellular damage from the electrical field. This method destroys microorganisms due to electroporation of cell membranes, membrane rupture, and cell lysis. In electroporation, excessive leakage of ions and intramolecular components results in cell death. In membrane rupture, cells swell due to an increase in moisture diffusion across the cell membrane. Pronounced disruption and decomposition of cell walls and cytoplasmic membranes causes cells to lyse.

Effect on nutrition

Decreased processing times in ohmic heating maintains nutritional and sensory properties of foods. Ohmic heating inactivates antinutritional factors like lipoxigenase (LOX), polyphenoloxidase (PPO), and pectinase due to the removal of active metallic groups in enzymes by the electrical field. Similar to other heating methods, ohmic heating causes gelatinization of starches, melting of fats, and protein agglutination. Water-soluble nutrients are maintained in the suspension liquid allowing for no loss of nutritional value if the liquid is consumed.

Limitations 
Ohmic heating is limited by viscosity, electrical conductivity, and fouling deposits. The density of particles within the suspension liquid can limit the degree of processing. A higher viscosity fluid will provide more resistance to heating, allowing the mixture to heat up quicker than low viscosity products.

A food product’s electrical conductivity is a function of temperature, frequency, and product composition. This may be increased by adding ionic compounds, or decreased by adding non-polar constituents. Changes in electrical conductivity limit ohmic heating as it is difficult to model the thermal process when temperature increases in multi-component foods.

Potential applications
The potential applications of ohmic heating range from cooking, thawing, blanching, peeling, evaporation, extraction, dehydration, and fermentation. These allow for ohmic heating to pasteurize particulate foods for hot filling, pre-heat products prior to canning, and aseptically process ready-to-eat meals and refrigerated foods. Prospective examples are outlined in Table 2 as this food processing method has not been commercially approved by the FDA. Since there is currently insufficient data on electrical conductivities for solid foods, it is difficult to prove the high quality and safe process design for ohmic heating. Additionally, a successful 12D reduction for C. botulinum prevention has yet to be validated.

References list

Food processing
Cooking techniques